Crassispira glaphyrella is an extinct species of sea snail, a marine gastropod mollusk in the family Pseudomelatomidae, the turrids and allies. Fossils have been found in Eocene strata in Lower Normandy, France.

References

 Cossmann (M.) & Pissarro (G.), 1900 -Faune éocènique du Cotentin. 1er article. Bulletin de la Société Géologique de Normandie, t. 19, p. 19-75

glaphyrella
Gastropods described in 1900